Samantha "Sam" Kirk (born in 1981 in Chicago, Illinois) is an American artist. She formerly worked in the advertising industry for ten years before pursuing an art career.

Biography
Samantha Kirk was born in Chicago in 1981. In Kirk's sophomore year of high school, she discovered art as an outlet for her to communicate her queer identity which she later integrated into her artwork. Later in life, Kirk worked in the advertising industry as an integrated marketing specialist for ten years, eventually leaving the industry. Kirk felt the advertising industry no longer challenged her and was not paying enough. In 2010, the opportunity to pursue an art career presented itself when she was offered two huge art commissions.

Murals

A Tribute to Victoria Cruz (2019)
Kirk was one of fifty international artists selected by the city of New York to paint a mural in the city as part of WorldPride 2019. She selected Victoria Cruz as the subject of her mural to celebrate Transgender Women of color and to feature a living person.

Sister Cities (2018)
Kirk became the first woman invited to participate in the Casablanca street art festival, CasaMouja, for which she painted a 28 ft x 50 ft mural to celebrate 35 years of Chicago Casablanca Sister Cities International exchange. The mural depicts two women facing opposite directions, highlights the connection between the two cities though miles apart.

Weaving Cultures (2016)
Kirk collaborated with Sandra Antongiorgi to create the Weaving Cultures mural. This brought awareness to the Chicago community about women growing up racially mixed and queer. The mural includes five women of different racial ethnicities and ages, including one transgender woman, all on a teal abstract background. All women displaying a stoic expression. The mural can be found on 16th and Blue Island in Chicago, Illiones.

Logan Square Mural (2017)
Kirk and Antongiorgi collaborated once again to create Logan Square Mural. This mural highlights the culture that once thrived at Logan Square before being gentrified. Kirk and Antongiorgi wanted people to take a step back to understand the mural and attempt to understand each other's differences. 
The mural displays three oversized individuals (one male and two females) surrounded by gray and brick red buildings and yellow metro tracks above. Below the three individuals, there are small people playing with a fire hydrant, selling ice cream, protesting, and driving a car. Around all of them are palm trees and city signs that read "Wilsure Hotel" & "Furniture". 
This mural was funded by Ramirez-Rosa by $20,000 in city money to celebrate “the diversity and history of Logan Square"

The Love I Vibrate (2018)
Kirk collaborated with Andy Bellomo and Sandra Antongiorgi to create The Love I Vibrate, a mural is to honor non-binary community members and Chicago's LGBTQ community. The Love I Vibrate is on the side of the Howard Brown Health Clinic in Chicago. The mural displays swirls of pink, blue, purple, and gold with a non-binary individual in the center with a shaved head and lips painted gold and eyes hot pink. 
This mural was funded by the City of Chicago Department of Cultural Affairs.

Group exhibitions

ICONIC Black Panther 
 Dates: November 2, 2018 – January 6, 2019 
 Objective: Recognition of the past century influential political movements.

Peeling off the Grey 
 Dates: May 11, 2018 - February 3, 2019 
 Objective: Breaking down the layers of gentrification in Pilsen. Artwork is meant to represent the heartache and turmoil felt by the community of Pilsen, Chicago.

Solo exhibitions

Double Dutch: An Exhibition by Sam Kirk 
 2016: Displayed through illustrations, paintings, and interactive artworks, Kirk shows her appreciation for Chicago & New York. Also shows how Kirk jumped between both cities as she discovered her identity and love.

Collections
Kirk has works in the permanent collection at the National Museum of Mexican Art in Chicago.

Honors and awards
 2021: Human First Award
 2021: Telley Award, Color
of Tomorrow 
 2021: Communicator Award, Color
of Tomorrow 
 2020: Davey Silver Award, Color
of Tomorrow 
 2017: 3Arts, Make a Wake Awardee 
 2014: Curators Choice Award

Bibliography
 Keenan Teddy Smith (2018). "Challenging the Narrative of “Gentrification as Development” in Chicago", Hypoallergenic 
 Ana Belaval (2018). "El Paseo Boricua welcomes new addition to public art that celebrates Latin cultures", WGN9 News 
 Vanessa Buneger (2018). "Pilsen Fest x Sam Kirk: How Art and Collaboration Can Make Change in Our City", Ideas Blog 
 Casera (CASH) Heining, (2018). "Sam Kirk | The importance of women of color in queer spaces, current residency at Chicago Art Department, and more", WGN Radio 
 Marissa N. Isang (2017). "Public art display celebrates Hispanic Heritage with 16 unique doors", ABC 7 News 
 Kim Janssen (2017). "City-funded Logan Square mural a response to gentrification, alderman says", Chicago Tribune 
 Alfonso Gutierrez (2017). "Arte inspirado en Dolores Huerta en Chicago", Telemundo Chicago 
 Columbia College Alumni (2017). "Colum Alum Spotlight: Sam Kirk '05", Columbia College Alumni 
 K. GUZMAN ⋅(2016). "Lesbian Couple Releases Greeting Card Line for Queers of Color", TheLstop
 Sharyn Jackson, Gena Hymowech, and Kat Long (2015). "100 Women We Love 2015", GOMAG 
 Claire Schubert (2015). "Through Eyes of Culture", Dekit Magazine 
 Danielle Evenski (2015)."CELEBRA LO RICO: JOIN MORENA CUADRA FOR A CUP OF COFFEE WITH SAM KIRK", QUE RICA VIDA 
 Ross Forman (2014). "Chicagoan Sam Kirk shines through art", Windy City Times

References

External links
 

1981 births
Living people
21st-century American women artists
American contemporary artists
Artists from Chicago
Columbia College Chicago alumni
American LGBT artists
Street artists
Women muralists